This is a list of the episodes from the anime series Nintama Rantarō based on the manga series, Rakudai Ninja Rantarō, written and illustrated by Sōbē Amako. The anime is produced by Ajia-do Animation Works and is directed by Tsutomu Shibayama. The series has been broadcast on NHK since April 10, 1993.

There are currently twenty five seasons (or story phases), each composed of many episodes. Below are the seasons and the number of episodes, as found on the official Japanese site. There are over 2,000 total episodes, with more in production.

Episode list

Season 1 (1993-94)

Season 2 (1994-95)

Season 3 (1995-96)
There are 120 episodes in Season 3.

Season 4 (1996)
There are 120 episodes in Season 4.

Season 5 (1997-98)
There are 100 episodes in Season 5.

Season 6 (1998)
There are 60 episodes in Season 6.

Season 7 (1999)
There are 80 episodes in Season 7.

Season 8 (2000)
There are 80 episodes in Season 8.

Season 9 (2001)
There are 80 episodes in Season 9.

Season 10 (2002)
There are 80 episodes in Season 10.

Season 11 (2003)
There are 80 episodes in Season 11.

Season 12 (2004)
There are 80 episodes in Season 12.

Season 13 (2005)
There are 56 episodes in Season 13.

Season 14 (2006)
There are 50 episodes in Season 14.

Season 15 (2007)
There are 50 episodes in Season 15.

Season 16 (2008)
There are 100 episodes in Season 16.

Season 17 (2009)
There are 90 episodes in Season 17.

Season 18 (2010)
There are 90 episodes in Season 18.

Season 19 (2011)
There are 90 episodes in Season 19.

Season 20 (2012)
There are 90 episodes in Season 20.

Season 21 (2013)
There are 75 episodes in Season 21.

Season 22 (2014-15)
There are 75 episodes in Season 22

Season 23 (2015-16)
There are 70 episodes in Season 23.

Season 24 (2016)
There are 70 episodes in Season 24.

Season 25 (2017)

Season 26 (2018)

Spin-offs

Ninjaboys: Quest for the Cosmic Front
Ninjaboys: Quest for the Cosmic Front (忍たま乱太郎の宇宙大冒険 with コズミックフロントNEXT) is a collaboration with the program Cosmic front ☆ NEXT (コズミックフロント☆NEXT) that aired in 2016.

Notes

References

Nintama Rantarō episode lists